The president of the Republic of Kosovo, is the head of state and chief representative of the Republic of Kosovo in the country and abroad.

The president is elected indirectly, by the Assembly of Kosovo, in a secret ballot by a two-thirds majority of deputies in functions. If no candidate achieves a two-thirds majority, at the third ballot the candidate who receives a simple majority is elected.

The vote in the Assembly should take place no later than a month before the end of the incumbent president's term of office. The president serves for a five-year term, renewable once.

History and precursor
The first post-war president, who served until his death in January 2006, was Ibrahim Rugova. His successor was Fatmir Sejdiu. When Sejdiu resigned from his post on 27 September 2010, Jakup Krasniqi served as acting president. On 22 February 2011, Behgjet Pacolli was elected as a president of Kosovo, which was quickly evaluated as unconstitutional move. On 4 April 2011, Behgjet Pacolli stepped down and it was decided that another candidate would be elected to serve for up to a year. A constitutional reform will be undertaken to allow for a popular vote for the president in 2013. On 7 April 2011, Atifete Jahjaga, Deputy Director of the Kosovo Police, with the rank of major general, was elected as president.

Officeholders

Socialist Autonomous Province of Kosovo (1945–1990)
 Parties

Republic of Kosova (recognised only by Albania)
 Parties

UN-administered Kosovo (1999–2008) 
 Parties

Republic of Kosovo (2008–present)
Political parties:

Latest election

See also
President of the Presidency of the Socialist Autonomous Province of Kosovo
Prime Minister of Kosovo
Special Representative of the Secretary-General for Kosovo

Notes and references
Notes:

References:

External links
President of Kosovo The official website

Politics of Kosovo

2002 establishments in Kosovo